The 24th Airborne Division, was a unit of the French Army, infantry dominated, specialized in airborne combats and air assaults. Constituted in July 1945, the Division existed ephemerally and during the dissolution in October of the same year, a significant amount of the Division's constitution would be seen transferred to the 25th Airborne Division in lieu recently of being constituted.

Creation and different nominations 

 On July 16, 1945 : creation of the 24th Airborne Division.
 On October 15, 1945: dissolution of the unit.

History, garrisons, campaigns and battles

This Division, first of a kind and genre in France, was constituted on July 16, 1945 based on the American model of U.S. Airborne Division formations. The forming infantry components of the Division were based on the active paratrooper units present in the Air Force, figuring components of the 1st Parachute Chasseur Regiment 1e R.C.P, the 2nd Parachute Chasseur Regiment 2e R.C.P, the 3rd Parachute Chasseur Regiment 3e R.C.P, the 4e R.I.A S.A.S and the 1st Choc Airborne Infantry Regiment 1er R.I.C.A.P, constituting the Choc Battalions B.C of the 1st Army with other forming infantry contingents from other active Divisions.

With effectifs undergoing reduction, the 3rd Parachute Chasseur Regiment 3e R.C.P and the 4e R.I.A were dissolved. During this period, elements of the French Air Force were transferred to the French Army on August 1, 1945.

The 24th Airborne Division 24e D.A.P was dissolved. Elements remaining of the 1st Parachute Chasseur Regiment, 1e R.C.P, the 2nd Parachute Chasseur Regiment 2e R.C.P, the 1st Choc Airborne Infantry Regiment 1er R.I.C.A.P and other forming components were transferred to the 25th Motoryzed Infantry Division 25e D.I.M, which would become the 25th Airborne Division 25e D.A.P in February 1946. Accordingly, général Bonjour assumed command of the newly formed 25th Airborne Division.

Division Commander 
1945 - 1945 : général Bonjour

See also 
Moroccan Division
Jean de Lattre de Tassigny
List of French paratrooper units

References

Sources and Bibliographies 
Collectif, Histoire des parachutistes français, Société de Production Littéraire, 1975.

Defunct airborne units and formations of France
Military units and formations established in 1945
Military units and formations disestablished in 1945
Airborne divisions of France